The beetroot is the taproot portion of a beet plant, usually known in North America as beets while the vegetable is referred to as beetroot in British English, and also known as the table beet, garden beet, red beet, dinner beet or golden beet.

It is one of several cultivated varieties of Beta vulgaris grown for their edible taproots and leaves (called beet greens); they have been classified as B. vulgaris subsp. vulgaris Conditiva Group.

Other cultivars of the same species include the sugar beet, the leaf vegetable known as chard or spinach beet, and mangelwurzel, which is a fodder crop. Three subspecies are typically recognized.

Etymology
Beta is the ancient Latin name for beetroot, possibly of Celtic origin, becoming bete in Old English. Root derives from the late Old English rōt, itself from Old Norse rót.

History
The domestication of beetroot can be traced to the emergence of an allele, which enables biennial harvesting of leaves and taproot. Beetroot was domesticated in the ancient Middle East, primarily for their greens, and were grown by the Ancient Egyptians, Greeks, and Romans. By the Roman era, it is thought that they were also cultivated for their roots. From the Middle Ages, beetroot was used to treat various conditions, especially illnesses relating to digestion and the blood. Bartolomeo Platina recommended taking beetroot with garlic to nullify the effects of "garlic-breath". 

During the middle of the 19th century, wine often was colored with beetroot juice. 

Food shortages in Europe following World War I caused great hardships, including cases of mangelwurzel disease, as relief workers called it. It was symptomatic of eating only beetroot.

Culinary use

Usually, the deep purple roots of beetroot are eaten boiled, roasted, or raw, and either alone or combined with any salad vegetable. The green, leafy portion of the beetroot is also edible. The young leaves can be added raw to salads, while the mature leaves are most commonly served boiled or steamed, in which case they have a taste and texture similar to spinach. Beetroot can be roasted, boiled or steamed, peeled, and then eaten warm with or without butter as a delicacy; cooked, pickled, and then eaten cold as a condiment; or peeled, shredded raw, and then eaten as a salad. Pickled beetroot is a traditional food in many countries.

Australia and New Zealand 

In Australia and New Zealand, sliced pickled beetroot is a common ingredient in traditional hamburgers.

Eastern Europe 
In Eastern Europe, beetroot soup, such as borscht [Ukrainian] and barszcz czerwony [Polish], is common. In Poland and Ukraine, beetroot is combined with horseradish to form ćwikła or бурячки (buryachky), which is traditionally used with cold cuts and sandwiches, but often also added to a meal consisting of meat and potatoes.

Similarly, in Serbia, beetroot (referred to by the local name cvekla) is used as winter salad, seasoned with salt and vinegar, with meat dishes.

As an addition to horseradish, it is also used to produce the "red" variety of chrain, a condiment in Ashkenazi Jewish, Hungarian, Polish, Lithuanian, Russian, and Ukrainian cuisine.

 is an old-time traditional Russian cold soup made from leftover beet greens and chopped beetroots, typically with bread and kvass added. Botvinya got its name from the Russian botva, which means "root vegetable greens", referring to beet plant leaves.

, or svyokolnik, is yet another Russian beet-based soup, typically distinguished from borscht in that vegetables for svekolnik are cooked raw and not sauteed, while many types of borscht typically include sauteed carrots and other vegetables. Svekolnik got its name from svyokla, Russian word for "beet." Sometimes, various types of cold borscht are also called "svekolnik".

India 
In Indian cuisine, chopped, cooked, spiced beetroot is a common side dish. Yellow-colored beetroots are grown on a very small scale for home consumption.

North America 
Besides standard fruit and vegetable dishes, certain varieties of beets are sometimes used as a garnish to a tart.

Northern Europe 
A common dish in Sweden and elsewhere in the Nordic countries is Biff à la Lindström, a variant of meatballs or burgers, with chopped or grated beetroot added to the minced meat.

In Northern Germany, beetroot is mashed with Labskaus or added as its side order.

Industrial production and other uses 
A large proportion of commercial production is processed into boiled and sterilized beetroot or pickles. 

Betanin, obtained from the roots, is used industrially as red food colorant to improve the color and flavor of tomato paste, sauces, desserts, jams and jellies, ice cream, candy, and breakfast cereals. When beetroot juice is used, it is most stable in foods with low water content, such as frozen novelties and fruit fillings.

Beetroot can be used to make wine.

Nutrition
Raw beetroot is 88% water, 10% carbohydrates, 2% protein, and less than 1% fat (see table). In a  amount providing  of food energy, raw beetroot is a rich source (27% of the Daily Value - DV) of folate and a moderate source (16% DV) of manganese, with other nutrients having insignificant content (table).

Health effects
A clinical trial review reported that consumption of beetroot juice modestly reduced systolic blood pressure but not diastolic blood pressure.

Safety
The red color compound betanin is not broken down in the body, and in higher concentrations, may temporarily cause urine or stools to assume a reddish color, in the case of urine a condition called beeturia.

Although harmless, this effect may cause initial concern due to the visual similarity to what appears to be blood in the stool, hematochezia (blood passing through the anus, usually in or with stool) or hematuria (blood in the urine).

Nitrosamine formation in beetroot juice can reliably be prevented by adding ascorbic acid.

Cultivars
Below is a list of several commonly available cultivars of beetroot. Generally, 55 to 65 days are needed from germination to harvest of the root. All cultivars can be harvested earlier for use as greens. Unless otherwise noted, the root colors are shades of red and dark red, with different degrees of zoning noticeable in slices.

See also
 List of Lepidoptera that feed on beetroot

Gallery

References

External links
 

Beta (plant)
Leaf vegetables
Root vegetables